Virk is a Jat clan. In India and Pakistan, it is used as a surname by the Jatt Sikhs and Jat Muslims.

Notable people with the surname, who may or may not be affiliated to the clan, include:
Adnan Virk, Canadian television sportscaster
Ammy Virk, Indian Punjabi-language singer
Jani Virk (born 1962), Slovenian writer, poet, translator and editor
Kapur Singh Virk, Sikh warrior
Kuwar Virk, Indian singer
Kulwant Singh Virk (1921–1987), Indian poet, writer and civil servant
Manjinder Virk (born 1975), British actress, film director and writer
Tomo Virk (born 1960), Slovenian historian and essayist

References

Indian surnames
Jat clans
Jat clans of Punjab
Pakistani names
Punjabi-language surnames
Surnames of Indian origin